Millennium:  The End of the World and the Forging of Christendom is a historical study of the Middle Ages by the popular historian Tom Holland. It was first published in 2008 by the Little, Brown Book Group.

See also 

 The Bright Ages

External links
The Telegraph review
The Independent review
The Guardian review

History books about the Middle Ages
2008 non-fiction books